Patricie Uwase (born 1989) is a Rwandan engineer and politician who currently serve as Minister of State in the Ministry of Infrastructure of the Government of Rwanda. Previously, she served as Chairperson of the Board of Rwandair and Permanent Secretary of Ministry of Infrastructure of Rwanda.

Education 
She holds a Bachelor of Science in civil engineering from the former Kigali Institute of Science and Technology (former KIST) in Rwanda, and a Master of Science in civil engineering from University of California, Berkeley

References 

21st-century Rwandan women politicians
21st-century Rwandan politicians
Living people
1989 births